A Song to Ruin is Million Dead's debut full-length album. It was released in 2003 through Xtra Mile Recordings/Integrity Records.

Critical reception
BBC Music called the album "essential listening for anyone with an ear for uncompromising, politicised rock sounds." musicOMH called it "heady punk rock, some of it fairly standard, much of it anything but; lyrics that could start a plethora of post-pub debates; and, all in all, a fine debut album."

Track listing
All words and music by Million Dead

 "Pornography for Cowards" – 2:01
 "Breaking the Back" – 3:12
 "I Am the Party" – 2:56
 "Charlie + the Propaganda Myth Machine" – 3:25
 "A Song to Ruin" – 5:47
 "Smiling at Strangers on Trains" – 2:55
 "MacGyver" – 3:28
 "Relentless” – 4:03
 "The Kids Are Going to Love It" – 2:47
 "The Rise and Fall" – 14:03
 “Gnostic Front” – 3:55 (Japanese bonus track)
 “Reformulating the Challenge to Archism” – 3:56 (Japanese bonus track)

Deluxe edition track listing
All words and music by Million Dead

 "Gnostic Front" – 3:55
 "I Gave My Eyes To Stevie Wonder" – 3:10
 "Medicine" – 4:10
 "Tonight Matthew" – 3:05
 "Asthma" – 4:47

Personnel
Frank Turner – Vocals
Ben Dawson – Drums, Bass on 'Asthma'
Cameron Dean – Guitar
Julia Ruzicka – Bass
Joe Gibb – Production, mastering
Alwyn Davies – Engineering
Andrew Charnik – Engineering
Kees Van Der Wiele – Photography

References

Million Dead albums
2003 debut albums